This is a list of governors of Tucumán Province, Argentina, after its separation in 1814 from the Municipality of Salta del Tucumán.

Civil war

Liberal / autonomist

20th century

Return to democracy (since 1983)

See also
Legislature of Tucumán

References
Citations

Sources